Université Nationale du Bénin FC is a football club of Benin, playing in the town of Porto-Novo. They play in the Beninese Second division.

In 1996 the team has won the Benin Cup.

Achievements
Benin Cup: 2:1996, 2007

Performance in CAF competitions
CAF Confederation Cup: 1 appearance
2008 CAF Confederation Cup – Preliminary Round

Stadium
Currently the team plays at the 15000 capacity Stade Charles de Gaulle.

References

External links

Football clubs in Benin
Sport in Porto-Novo